The Palio Città della Quercia is an annual track and field meeting held at the  in Rovereto, Italy. Usually held in late August or early September, it is a European Athletics premier meeting. It is the oldest international athletics meeting in Italy, having been first held in Rovereto in 1965.

Rovereto also hosts the Cross della Vallagarina, an elite level cross-country race.

Meet records

Men

Women

References

External links 
Palio Citta della Quercia
Meeting records

Athletics competitions in Italy
European Athletic Association meetings
Recurring sporting events established in 1965
Autumn events in Italy